The Air Creation Skypper is a French ultralight trike, designed and produced by Air Creation of Aubenas. The aircraft was introduced in 2011 and is supplied complete and ready-to-fly.

Design and development
The Skypper was designed as a simpler, lighter and less expensive carriage than the top-of-the line Air Creation Tanarg, to replace the Air Creation GT series in production. It was intended to comply with the Fédération Aéronautique Internationale microlight category. It features a cable-braced hang glider-style high-wing, weight-shift controls, a two-seats-in-tandem, open cockpit, tricycle landing gear with wheel pants and a single engine in pusher configuration.

The aircraft is made from bolted-together aluminum tubing, with its double surface wing covered in Dacron sailcloth. The wing is supported by a single tube-type kingpost and uses an "A" frame weight-shift control bar. Available powerplants include the a twin cylinder, liquid-cooled, two-stroke, dual-ignition  Rotax 582 engine, the four cylinder, air and liquid-cooled, four-stroke, dual-ignition  Rotax 912UL or  Rotax 912ULS engine and the twin cylinder, air-cooled, four-stroke, dual-ignition  HKS 700E.

A number of different wings can be fitted to the basic carriage, including the Air Creation NuviX, Fun 450, iFun 16, iXess 13 and the BioniX.

When equipped with the Bionix wing and Rotax 912 engine the Skypper was €6,300 cheaper than the more sophisticated Air Creation Tanarg with the same engine and wing, in 2011.

Specifications (Skypper 582 NuviX)

References

External links
Official Skypper 912 website
Official Skypper 582 website

2010s French sport aircraft
2010s French ultralight aircraft
Homebuilt aircraft
Single-engined pusher aircraft
Ultralight trikes
High-wing aircraft
Skypper